The 2008 Winchester Council election took place on 1 May 2008 to elect members of Winchester District Council in Hampshire, England. One third of the council was up for election and the Conservative Party stayed in overall control of the council.

After the election, the composition of the council was:
Conservative 29
Liberal Democrat 24
Independent 3
Labour 1

Campaign
One third of the seats were being contested with the Conservatives, Liberal Democrats and Labour each contesting all 19 seats. The Conservatives, who ran the council since the 2006 election were defending 6 seats compared to 11 for the Liberal Democrats and 2 independents. Among the councillors who were defending seats were the Conservative council leader, George Beckett, and the Liberal Democrat group leader Therese Evans. Other candidates included 2 independents, 7 from the United Kingdom Independence Party and 4 from the Green Party.

The Conservatives defended their record of running the council saying that they had improved services while keeping council tax rises below the rate of inflation. Meanwhile, the Liberal Democrats criticised the Conservatives over housing and development in the council area.

During the campaign a Conservative activist in Whiteley ward, John Hall, was charged after a police investigation over electoral fraud offences.

Election result
The results saw the Conservatives just maintain their one-seat majority after losing two seats to the Liberal Democrats in St Barnabas and Whiteley wards, but gaining one seat back in St Michael and taking one seat from an independent in Shedfield.

Ward results

Bishop's Waltham

Boarhunt & Southwick

Colden Common and Twyford

Compton and Otterbourne

Denmead

Kings Worthy

Littleton and Harestock

Olivers Battery & Badger Farm

Shedfield

St. Barnabas

St. Bartholomew

St. John and All Saints

St. Luke

St. Michael

St. Paul

The Alresfords

Whiteley

Wickham

Wonston and Micheldever

References

2008
2008 English local elections
2000s in Hampshire